Bradley Staddon (born 4 August 1984) is a Zimbabwean first-class cricketer who plays for Matabeleland Tuskers.

References

External links
 

1984 births
Living people
Zimbabwean cricketers
Matabeleland Tuskers cricketers
Sportspeople from Bulawayo